Dina Rabinovitch (9 June 1962 – 30 October 2007) was an American-born British journalist and writer who wrote a column for The Guardian.

Early life and education 
Born in Charleston, South Carolina, she was the fifth of six children born to the Halakhist Rabbi, Nahum Rabinovitch. The family later moved to Toronto for a short period before settling in London. Rabinovitch was educated at Hasmonean High School and Henrietta Barnett School. She earned a Bachelor of Arts in International Relations from the London School of Economics in 1993 and Master of Arts in Creative Writing from the University of East Anglia in 2000.

Career 
After graduating from the London School of Economics, Rabinovitch worked as a freelance journalist before joining The Independent. After the birth of her first child, Rabinovitch returned to freelance writing, specializing in interviews. Rabinovitch later joined The Guardian, writing a regular column for the G2 blog.

Personal life 
An Orthodox Jew, she lived in London with her second husband, lawyer Anthony Julius, with whom she had one child and through whom she had four stepchildren. With her first husband, financier Guido Rauch, she had three daughters.

Rabinovitch, who died of breast cancer on 30 October 2007, aged 45, wrote regular columns describing her cancer-related experiences. These columns were published as the book Take Off Your Party Dress in March 2007. Proceeds from the sale of the book go to the CTRT Appeal, a million-pound appeal to set up a cancer trials research centre at Mount Vernon Hospital in London.

References

External links
Obituary in The Times, 3 November 2007
Rabinovitch's The Guardian columns

1962 births
2007 deaths
People educated at Henrietta Barnett School
Alumni of the London School of Economics
Alumni of the University of East Anglia
American emigrants to England
American Orthodox Jews
Deaths from cancer in England
Deaths from breast cancer
English Jewish writers
English Orthodox Jews
English women journalists
English women non-fiction writers
Writers from Charleston, South Carolina
The Guardian journalists
Writers from London